Susana Noriega Rivero (born 1952) is a contemporary Mexican painter, whose style is personal and avant-garde which is inscribed in the abstract expressionist and surrealist movements. Her art often expresses extreme mental states, unconventional ideas, or elaborate fantasy worlds.

Biography 
Born in Mexico City, Noriega Rivero took part in various contests. In 1971, her artistic interests led her to attend the workshops of great masters, such as Raúl Anguiano, Rodolfo Nieto, Luis Velasco, Guillermo Zapfe, and Pascual Santillán.

Although she studied advertising and psychology, she recognized herself as a painter, and she devoted most of her time to pursuing this activity.

Techniques and style 
She has made incursions into many techniques: engraving and wood carving; paper engraving; graphic projects for sculpture, as well as painting with charcoal, pigments with oil or water, resins, marble powder, sand and soil, all of them on canvas, wood, clay, stone and paper.

She has specialized in handling graphite and charcoal on paper, as well as mixed techniques with pigments and water or oil, ground marble, sands and resins on canvas. She continuously renews herself, having developed a personal avant-garde style with some influence from abstract expressionism and surrealism. Outsider art is conventionally considered as one of the trends of informalism, but in this painter it is fused with neo-figurative art, an expressionist revival in modern form of figurative art. The term "neo-figurative" emerged in the 1960s in Mexico and Spain to represent a new form of figurative art.

Jean Dubuffet, influenced by Hans Prinzhorn's book Artistry of the Mentally Ill, coined the term art brut, which may be approximately translated as "art in the rough", to refer to the art made by non-professionals or who do not follow aesthetic rules, such as social misfits, children, mentally troubled people, prisoners, etc. Dubuffet gathered a collection of this kind of paintings, which includes works by Aloïse Corbaz, Alfredo Pirucha and  Adolf Wölfli. Dubuffet aspired to create an art free from intellectual worries, in which elementary, childish and often cruel figures prevail.

Features 
Some traits of Noriega's work in line with outsider art are:
 Rough, spontaneous, grotesque and thoughtless quality, akin to the unconscious.
 Images that reflect her inner world.
 Use of onirist-like devices.
 Rejection of the traditional approaches to composition (coherence, organization, homogeneity, etc.).
 Great freedom in drawing and palette (earthy, pale or bright colors prevail depending on the mood of each painting).
 Use of very different materials mixed with the paint (plaster, sand, cement, gravel), which add texture and relief.
 Expressive effects through richly material, textured effects.
 Recurring motifs developed during extended periods of time (flower vases, the human body, musical instruments, hearts, animals).

Exhibitions 
Her first single exhibition, in the Alliance Française at San Ángel in Mexico City, was inaugurated on Friday, April 27, 1979. The Mexico City paper Novedades reviewed:

She went on to exhibit, either individually or collectively, in the following venues and galleries:
 Galería Estela Shapiro, Mexico City, 1980
 Centro de Estudios en Ciencias de la Comunicación, Mexico City, 1982, 1983
 Secretaría de Cultura y Bienestar Social del gobierno del estado de Querétaro (today Instituto Queretano de la Cultura y las Artes), México, 1985, 1986, 1987
 Casa de Cultura de Toluca, State of Mexico, 1991, 1992
 Centro Cultural Juan Rulfo, Mixcoac, Mexico City, 1996
 Mandarin House Restaurant Exhibition Hall, San Ángel, Mexico City, 1996, 1997
 Misrachi Gallery, Oaxaca, México, 1998
 Casa de las Campanas de Tlalpan, Mexico City, 1998, 1999, 2000
 X-Dada Exhibition Center, 2001
 Constante y Asociados Gallery, 1999, 2000, 2201, 2002
 Casa de la Cultura Jaime Sabines, Galerías Adán y Eva, Mexico City, 2002
 La Cueva de Bouchot, 2002, 2003, 2004, 2005
 The painter's studio, 2006-2013
 Goiko Arte, online gallery, 2013-2018
 Café-Arte, Guadalupe Inn, Mexico City, 2014
 Centro Cultural Juan Rulfo, Mixcoac, Mexico City, 2016

From the 1960s she has contributed with her paintings to different media, such as magazines Plural (currently Vuelta) and Sí para Jóvenes, and  newspapers El Sol de Querétaro and El Sol de Toluca. She has also illustrated short-story and poetry collections.

Painting collections 
Virginia Aspe Armella, Norma Barquet, Enrique Beraha, Alfonso and Ernesto Bolio, Ezequiel Castro, Ana Laura Constante, Paloma De Lille, Rubén Durand, Cecilia and María Luisa Elío, Francisco Franco Ibargüengoitia, Carlos Fuentes, Jomí García Ascot, Raúl Gasca, Alicia Ibáñez Parkman, Luis Legarreta, Alberto Lifshitz, Carmen Madero, Pablo Marentes, Martha Maza, Maricela Mir, Héctor Muciño, Pedro Ojeda, Octavio Paz, Erwin Preston, Mario Quiñones, Agustín and Nieves Rivero Blásquez, Héctor Rivero Borrell, Ricardo Secín, Carlos Serrano, Estela Shapiro, Malke Tapuach, Ángela Treviño, Carmen Ubaldini, Luis Velasco.

Gallery

References

External links 
  Wikimedia Commons has media related to Susana Noriega.
 Prinzhorn Collection (in German)
 Biography at Societé des Écrivains (in French)
 At Goiko Arte

1952 births
Living people
Outsider artists
20th-century Mexican painters
21st-century Mexican painters
Artists from Mexico City
Women outsider artists
20th-century Mexican women artists
21st-century Mexican women artists